Francis A. DeSales (March 23, 1912 – September 25, 1988) was an American actor known for playing Harold Faller in The Big Story, Sheriff Maddox in Two Faces West, and Ralph Dobson in The Adventures of Ozzie and Harriet.

Born in Philadelphia, DeSales was survived by his wife Doris when he died of cancer at his home in Van Nuys at the age of 76.

Film roles

In Mr. And Mrs. North, as Lieutenant Bill Weigan, 1954.
Headline Hunters (1955) - Tribune Reporter (uncredited)
Terror at Midnight (1956) - Police Lt. Conway
The Girl He Left Behind (1956) - Army Psychiatrist (uncredited)
All Mine to Give (1957) - Mr. Stephens
The Unholy Wife (1957) - John Hayward, Defense Attorney (uncredited)
Portland Exposé (1957) - Alfred Grey (uncredited)
The Wayward Girl (1957) - Investigator Butler
Jailhouse Rock (1957) - Surgeon (uncredited)
The Hard Man (1957) - Captain Peters (uncredited)
Return to Warbow (1958) - Sheriff (uncredited)
Darby's Rangers (1958) - Captain (uncredited)
Too Much, Too Soon (1958) - Imperial Pictures Executive (uncredited)
The Lineup (1958) - Chester McPhee (uncredited)
The High Cost of Loving (1958) - Charles Blake (uncredited)
No Time for Sergeants (1958) - Sgt. T.C. Payne (uncredited)
Apache Territory (1958) - Sgt. Sheehan
Senior Prom (1958) - Carter Breed
Revolt in the Big House (1958) - Chief of Detectives (uncredited)
Up Periscope (1959) - Captain Quinn (uncredited)
Face of a Fugitive (1959) - Deputy Sheriff George Allison 
It Started with a Kiss (1959) - Car Company Representative (uncredited)
Operation Petticoat (1959) - Capt. Kress (uncredited)
Psycho (1960) - Deputy District Attorney Alan Deats (uncredited)
Sunrise at Campobello (1960) - Riley (uncredited)
Let No Man Write My Epitaph (1960) - Night Court Magistrate
A Fever in the Blood (1961) - Conventioneer (uncredited)
The Police Dog Story (1961) - Captain Dietrich
When the Clock Strikes (1961) - Warden
The Honeymoon Machine (1961) - U.S. Senator (uncredited)
The Flight that Disappeared (1961) - George Manson (uncredited)
A Majority of One (1961) - American Embassy Representative
A Global Affair (1964) - U.S. Delegate (uncredited)
Kisses for My President (1964) - Reporter (uncredited)
The Third Day (1965) - Sanford - Board Member (uncredited)
The Plainsman (1966) - Gambler (uncredited)
Sweet November (1968) - Armstrong
The Arrangement (1969) - Presentation Executive (uncredited)
Tora! Tora! Tora! (1970) - Capt. Arthur H. McCollum - Wilkinson's Subordinate with Stark (uncredited)
Conquest of the Planet of the Apes (1972) - Auction Attendee (uncredited)
The Outfit (1973) - Jim
The Strongest Man in the World (1975) - Regent (uncredited)
Moving Violation (1976) - Lawyer 
Rabbit Test (1978) - Cardinal (final film role)

References

External links

1912 births
1988 deaths
American male stage actors
American male television actors
American male film actors
Male actors from New York City
Male actors from Greater Los Angeles
People from Van Nuys, Los Angeles
Male actors from Philadelphia
20th-century American male actors